Pušća is a municipality in Zagreb County in Croatia. According to the 2011 census, 2,700 people live in Pušća, 97 percent of which are Croats.

Settlements
Bregovljana
 Donja Pušća
Dubrava Pušćanska
Gornja Pušća
Hrebine
Hruševec Pušćanski
Marija Magdalena
Žlebec Pušćanski

References

External links 

 

Populated places in Zagreb County
Zaprešić
Municipalities of Croatia